The White Nile Petroleum Operating Company (WNPOC) is a petroleum exploration and production company operating in Sudan. It was incorporated in 2001. Production is expected to increase to 500,000 barrels of oil per day by the end of 2006, following the completion of a pipeline in April 2006 linking South Sudan's oil fields to Khartoum and Port Sudan.

Stakeholders and partners 
WNPOC is a joint operating company owned by:

 Petronas Carigall Overseas of Malaysia: 50%
 Sudapet of Sudan: 50%

WNPOC operates in partnership with these other companies:

 ONGC Videsh (the overseas arm of ONGC) of India
 Lundin Petroleum of Sweden
 Hi Tech Petroleum

See also 
 Economy of Sudan

References

External links 
White Nile Petroleum Operating company website

Oil and gas companies of Sudan
Companies based in Khartoum
Energy companies established in 2001
Non-renewable resource companies established in 2001

de:Greater Nile Petroleum Operating Company